Poisy is a commune in the Haute-Savoie department in the Auvergne-Rhône-Alpes region in south-eastern France. It is part of the urban area of Annecy.

Geography 
The Fier forms the commune's southern border.

Population

See also 
 Communes of the Haute-Savoie department

References 

Communes of Haute-Savoie